Cordylobia is a genus of flies from the family Calliphoridae. The larvae of Cordylobia are parasitic on mammals, especially rodents. Two species, C. anthropophaga (the tumbu fly) and C. rodhaini (Lund's fly), also are known as parasites of humans. The adult flies feed on rotting fruits, vegetables, and animal faeces, and are most abundant in the wet season. Like many tropical insects, they are most active in the morning and evening. Cordylobia species are largely confined to Africa, though they have been recorded elsewhere when transported by human travellers.

Species
The genus consists of four species:
Cordylobia anthropophaga (Blanchard, 1872) - tumbu fly
Cordylobia rodhaini Gedoelst, 1910 (=ebadiana) - Lund's fly
Cordylobia roubaudi Villeneuve, 1929
Cordylobia ruandae Fain, 1953
Pachychoeromyia praegrandis Austen, 1910 was originally described as belonging to Cordylobia, but is now placed in the monotypic genus Pachychoeromyia Villeneuve, 1920.

References 

Calliphoridae
Parasitic flies
Parasitic arthropods of mammals
Insects of Africa
Oestroidea genera